Woodlands Memorial Ground is a rugby stadium in Lytham St Annes, Lancashire, England. It is the home of Fylde Rugby Club and was the home of the Blackpool Panthers between 2006 and 2010.

The Northern Rail Nines group matches, quarter and semi finals were held at the ground in July 2009 with the finals taking place at Bloomfield Road, Blackpool.

History
Fylde Rugby Club were founded in 1919 and first used the Woodlands for rugby union in May 1920.

During the Second World War, the Army took over the ground. In 1946 the President, G.W. Parkes, welcomed back members from the forces and the ground was purchased for £7,000. It was named the Woodlands Memorial Ground in recognition of those members who gave their lives during World War II.

In the 1950s, the dressing rooms were erected.

It was in 1964 that the second England trial was held at Fylde and Sir Laurie Edwards opened the new pavilion extension.

In 1970 the North West Counties played the Fijian Tourists at the Woodlands and attracted a record gate of 7,600.

Fylde Rugby Club ran up significant debts in trying to compete in National One in the years 1997-9 and had to sell a small portion of the Woodlands grounds in order to re-establish financial health. With the receipts of the sale, a period of re-development of facilities of all kinds at the Woodlands began in January 2005. The new clubhouse opened in October 2005 and houses 500 people.

In June and July Blackpool Panthers played three rugby league games at Woodlands whilst Bloomfield Road was being reseeded. The Blackpool Panthers beat Keighley Cougars and Workington Town and lost to Gateshead Thunder.

In October 2006 a contract was signed between the Blackpool Panthers and Fylde R.F.C. for an initial period of six years, covering the seasons 2007–2012. The administrative and commercial base of the Blackpool Panthers, as well as the National League games moved to the Woodlands Memorial Ground.

International rugby union returned to the ground in February 2015 when the England Counties XV played the Scotland Club XV for the first time.

See also
List of English rugby league stadiums by capacity

References

External links
Fylde Rugby Club official site
Blackpool Panthers official site

Defunct rugby league venues in England
Rugby union stadiums in England
Sport in the Borough of Fylde
Lytham St Annes
Sports venues completed in 1920
Rugby union in Lancashire